Ana Katz (born November 2, 1975) is an Argentine writer, director and actress.  Her writing and directing credits include My Friend from the Park, Los Marziano, Musical Chairs, A Stray Girlfriend and Florianópolis Dream.  Her acting-only credits include The Candidate, Loco por vos,  Kiki, Love to Love and The Dog who wouldn't be quiet .

Katz was born in Buenos Aires.

References

External links
 

1975 births
Living people
Argentine actresses
Argentine screenwriters
Jewish Argentine actresses
Jewish Argentine writers
Writers from Buenos Aires
Argentine film directors